The 2000 season of the Ukrainian Championship was the 9th season of Ukraine's women's football competitions. The championship ran from 4 August through 26 August first stage and 12 to 16 November 2000 final group.

The UEFA announced about the start of the UEFA Women's Cup starting in 2001. The struggling Ukrainian women football suddenly received an impulse of interest and the league competitions doubled in size. It was the first time Kharkiv-based female teams joined the football competitions for the first time since fall of the Soviet Union.

The clubs were set in two groups with the top two from each contesting the title in championship round robin tournament. For the first time championship was won by Lehenda-Cheksil Chernihiv.

Teams

Team changes

Name changes
 Mriya last competed in 1994
 SKIF last competed as Lvivianka in 1998

First stage

Group A

Group B

Finals

References

External links
WFPL.ua
Women's Football.ua

2000
1999–2000 in Ukrainian association football leagues
2000–01 in Ukrainian association football leagues
Ukrainian Women's League
Ukrainian Women's League